MVSN may refer to:

Paramilitary organizations
 Milizia Volontaria per la Sicurezza Nazionale, better known as the Blackshirts, the Italian Fascist paramilitary groups
 Milice de Volontaires de la Sécurité Nationale, better known as the Tonton Macoute, a Haitian paramilitary force created in 1959

Companies
 Macrovision, the former name of the software company Rovi Corporation.